Compsodrillia drewi is an extinct species of sea snail, a marine gastropod mollusk in the family Pseudomelatomidae, the turrids and allies.

Description
The length of the shell attains 10 mm

Distribution
Fossils have been found in Pliocene strata of North Carolina, USA.

References

 J.A. Gardner. 1948. Mollusca from the Miocene and Lower Pliocene of Virginia and North Carolina: Part 2. Scaphopoda and Gastropoda. United States Geological Survey Professional Paper 199(B):179-310

drewi
Gastropods described in 1948